Amirreza Ghomi (Persian: امیررضا قمی;born 1 January 1968), who is better known as Amir Ghomi (Persian: امیر قمی); He is a former judoka and coach from Iran. He is the first judo Olympian and one of the athletes of the Iranian Judo Federation. After winning the World Judo Championships and participating in international competitions, including the 1996 Atalanta Summer Olympics and the 2000 Sydney Summer Olympics, he also has the World Judo Championship in his sports record.

References

1968 births
Living people
Iranian male judoka
Olympic judoka of Iran
Judoka at the 1996 Summer Olympics
Place of birth missing (living people)
20th-century Iranian people